is a former Japanese football player. His twin brother Kazuyuki Morisaki is also footballer.

Club career
Morisaki was born in Hiroshima on May 9, 1981. He joined Sanfrecce Hiroshima from youth team in 2000. He played many matches as offensive midfielder from 2002 and became a central player of the club with his twin brother Kazuyuki Morisaki. In 2000s, although he played many matches, he suffered from occupational burnout in 2005 and chronic fatigue syndrome in 2009. In 2010s, although his opportunity to play decreased, the club won the champions 2012, 2013 and 2015 J1 League. He retired end of 2016 season.

National team career
In June 2001, Morisaki was selected Japan U-20 national team for 2001 World Youth Championship. At this tournament, he played 2 matches. In August 2004, he was selected Japan U-23 national team for 2004 Summer Olympics. He played all 3 matches.

Club statistics

1Includes Japanese Super Cup, J.League Championship and FIFA Club World Cup.

National team career statistics

Appearances in major competitions

Honors

Club
Sanfrecce Hiroshima
J1 League: 2012, 2013, 2015
J2 League: 2008
Japanese Super Cup: 2008, 2013, 2014, 2016

References

External links

1981 births
Living people
Association football people from Hiroshima Prefecture
Japanese footballers
Japan youth international footballers
J1 League players
J2 League players
Sanfrecce Hiroshima players
Olympic footballers of Japan
Footballers at the 2004 Summer Olympics
Association football midfielders
Twin sportspeople
Japanese twins